Glen Murphy (born 4 February 1971) is an Australian former professional rugby league footballer who played in the 1990s. Primarily a er, he was a foundation player for the North Queensland Cowboys and later, a member of their coaching staff.

Playing career
Born and raised in Sarina, Queensland, Murphy played for Mackay in the Foley Shield (winning the competition in 1992 and 1994), before joining the North Queensland Cowboys for their inaugural season in 1995. He made his first grade debut in Round 3 of that year, his only game for the season. During his five seasons with the club, Murphy would play 52 games, scoring four tries. In Round 21 of the 1999 NRL season, he played his 50th game for the club, the fourth player to do so.

Achievements and accolades

Individual
North Queensland Cowboys Clubman of the Year: 2006

Statistics

ARL/SL/NRL

Post-playing career
Following his retirement, Murphy joined the Cowboys' coaching staff as the head strength and conditioning coach and was named their Clubman of the Year in 2006. At the end of the 2013 season, he was released after seven seasons in the role. In 2015, he worked as a strength and conditioning coach for the Townsville Blackhawks.

References

1971 births
Living people
Australian rugby league players
North Queensland Cowboys players
Rugby league second-rows
Rugby league locks
Rugby league players from Queensland